Richard Vance Wolfenden NAS AAA&S (born May 17, 1935) is an Alumni Distinguished Professor of chemistry, biochemistry and biophysics at the University of North Carolina at Chapel Hill. He was elected to the National Academy of Sciences in 2002. His research involves the kinetics of enzymatic reactions, and his laboratory has made significant contributions to the understanding of catalytic rate enhancements.

Education
Wolfenden earned his A.B. in chemistry from Princeton University in 1956, after completing a senior thesis titled "Metabolism of Cobalt and Vitamin B12 in Rats." He then received a bachelor's degree and a master's degree in animal physiology from Exeter College, University of Oxford. He earned his Ph.D. from the Rockefeller University in 1964 (then known as the Rockefeller Institute).

Career
Wolfenden initially taught at Princeton University, but in 1970 he joined the faculty at the University of North Carolina as associate professor of biochemistry. He became full professor in 1973. Wolfenden was elected as a member of the American Academy of Arts and Sciences in 2002.

References

External links
 Wolfenden et al publications on Pubmed

1935 births
Living people
American biochemists
Princeton University alumni
Members of the United States National Academy of Sciences
Alumni of Exeter College, Oxford
Rockefeller University alumni
University of North Carolina at Chapel Hill faculty